Tanjareen Chere Thomas (née Martin) is an American actress, producer, comedian, and radio personality.

Biography

She was born in Inglewood, California.

Career

Her television credits include: Millennials, Famous in Love, Family Time, Curb Your Enthusiasm, Days of Our Lives, Strong Medicine, Howard Stern, The Steve Harvey Show, and City Guys.  But Thomas is also known for her roles in the films: I Got The Hook Up 2, Johnson Family Vacation as Tangerine, Love For Sale,  and Miss March.  She has also been in several national commercials, music videos, she's co-hosted weekly radio shows, and hosts weekly live streams.

Filmography

Film and TV Movies

Television

Commercials
 2001 - Subway Sandwiches
 2003 - Pop Secret Popcorn
 2003 - Reebok D'Funkd Clothing (print ad)
 2004 - McDonald's Salads
 2005 - Southwest Airlines
 2006 - Michelob Beer
 2008 - Body By Jake Shadow Boxer
 2008 - Pizza Hut Tuscani Pasta
 2012 - Dherbs Full Body Detox
 2014-2017 - Denny's Grand Slams campaign (VoiceOver)
 2021 - Hulu

Radio hosting
2008-2009: co-host of "Speedy's Comedy Corner" on The Foxxhole
2008–2010: co-host of "Chopping It Up Live" on 93.5fm KDAY (Los Angeles) and on  DherbsRadio.com
 2011-2012: co-host of "Black Hollywood Weekly with The Sistars" for AfterBuzz TV
 2015: host of "Musical Boot Camp" on "HumorMillMag.com"

References

External links
 
 
 Tanjareen on YouTube

Living people
Actresses from Inglewood, California
African-American actresses
American film actresses
American television actresses
21st-century African-American people
21st-century African-American women
20th-century African-American people
20th-century African-American women
Year of birth missing (living people)